The  mask is a mask used in Japanese Noh theater, representing a jealous female demon. It is characterized by two sharp bull-like horns, metallic eyes, and a leering mouth. In Noh plays, the type of mask changes according to the degree of jealousy, resentment, and anger of the female characters.

The  is also called . These masks, which represent the jealousy, resentment, and anger of female demons, are classified as  masks.

It is said that there are now more than 250 types of Noh masks, but the oldest historical record of Noh masks, mentions only about 14 types of masks, and the name  is not found among them.

The differentiation of mask types seems to have progressed in the 16th century, and the name  appears in the works of Shimoma Nakataka, a monk, samurai and Noh actor active from the 1580s to the 1610s.

Etymology
The word  is a Japanese phonetic transcription of the Sanskrit word , meaning 'wisdom of the Buddha'. There are several hypotheses as to why the mask used in Noh, which represents a vengeful spirit expressing female jealousy and resentment, was named . The second hypothesis is that it was named after the line  in the Noh play . The  in this line refers to the voice reciting the Heart Sutra, which repels evil spirits. An alternative explanation is that the artist would need a great deal of wisdom in order to create this mask.

Characteristics

The  mask is used in many Noh and  plays, as well as in Shinto ritual  dances. The  mask portrays the souls of women who have become demons due to obsession or jealousy, similar to the Buddhist concept of a hungry ghost.

The  mask is said to be demonic and dangerous but also sorrowful and tormented, displaying the complexity of human emotions. When the actor looks straight ahead, the mask appears frightening and angry; when tilted slightly down, the face of the demon appears to be sorrowful, as though crying. The ability to change the expression of the mask through use of perspective is a feature commonly seen in Noh theatre.

Plays associated with 
 – worn by the Lady Rokujō in her second-half appearance as a demon.
 – can be worn by the dancing woman in her second-half appearance as a snake, though the  mask is also used.
 – The story is about a woman who appears to Nichiren and reveals her true identity as a giant snake, but is transformed into a heavenly maiden by the Nichiren's recitation of sutras. In the scene where the serpent transforms into a heavenly maiden,  appears wearing a woman's mask overlaid with  mask, and removes the  mask in the middle of the scene.
 – the story of a woman who is divorced from her husband and becomes a demon, cursing him and his future wife, but is repelled by the prayers of Abe no Seimei.
 (known in the Kanze school as ) – worn by the spinning woman of Adachigahara after she is revealed to be a demon.
 – can be worn by the noblewoman after she is revealed to be a demon.

Masks similar to  

In Noh plays, the type of mask changes according to the degree of jealousy, resentment, and anger of the female characters.

The  mask type is a type of  mask and is used exclusively in the  performance.

The  mask is a mask that represents the first stage of a woman's transformation into a demoness as her emotions begin to rise. The  mask is also used as a mask that is not associated with a woman's resentment, jealousy, or anger, but simply represents that she has gone from human to supernatural beings.

The  mask is painted red from the eyes down, and has more disheveled hair and more prominent golden eyes than the  mask. These features of the mask indicate that the woman has a strong desire for revenge.

The  mask represents a woman in the process of becoming a demoness, with short horns sprouting from both sides of her forehead.

In Buddhism, a person who hindered enlightenment was sometimes likened to a poisonous snake. While women, unlike men, were regarded as beings incapable of attaining enlightenment, they were often likened to demoness or poisonous or evil snakes, and when their desires were not satisfied, they were believed to kill people in order to take revenge.

In popular culture

 In the 1964 Japanese horror film , an older woman wears a  mask after stealing it from a samurai.
 The 1975 Japanese experimental short film  depicts a figure in an outdoor environment, wearing a robe and a  mask.
 In the mobile game , the character Hannya is a  who has a  mask on his forehead and another on his back.
In the manga and anime Rurouni Kenshin, a character named Hannya wears one of these masks and it is his namesake.
The  legend also influences a local tradition that follows the story of two envious girls who set up another named Ohana to be executed so they can steal her various kimono, but end up murdered by Ohana's vengeful soul, reborn as an immortal demon.
 In the 1995 platform game Mega Man 7, the boss of the third Wily Fortress stage is HannyaNED², a -shaped flying robot Dr. Wily had found frozen in a glacier and that swore loyalty to him after being rescued.
 In the 1998 survival horror video game Clock Tower II: The Struggle Within, a character named George Maxwell wears a  mask while wielding a large hatchet, implying when he was infected with a parasitic bacteria and became insane, he concealed his face with the mask.
 In 2011 the game Team Fortress 2 in collaboration with Total War: Shogun 2 featured a cosmetic item called Noh Mercy.
 In the 2013 video game Tomb Raider there are three masks that can be found but one of them is called Hannya Mask which is founded during Lara Croft's adventures in the fictional area of the Dragon's Tooth. It can be found at Coastal Forest. Further examining the mask will give the player that this mask has traces of white paint inside indicating whoever used it was of noble birth.
 In the 2019 action adventure video game Sekiro: Shadows Die Twice, one of the bosses named the Corrupted Monk wears a  mask to conceal her true face. She is based on the story of Yao Bikuni and the Ningyo and bears a likeness to her story, being an immortal monk who gained immortality due to eating a type of meat.
 In the 2022 action-adventure video game Ghostwire: Tokyo, the main antagonists conceals their identities with  masks.

See also
 Hungry ghost

References

External links
Netsuke: masterpieces from the Metropolitan Museum of Art, an exhibition catalog from The Metropolitan Museum of Art (fully available online as PDF), which contains many examples of Hannya
Female legendary creatures 
Japanese legendary creatures
Masks in Asia
Noh
Oni